Mudgee was an electoral district of the Legislative Assembly in the Australian state of New South Wales first created in 1859, partly replacing Wellington and Bligh and named after and including Mudgee. Following the abolition of Goldfields West in 1880, it elected three members simultaneously, with voters casting three votes and the three leading candidates being elected. In 1894 it was divided into the single-member electorates of Mudgee and Rylstone. In 1920, with the introduction of proportional representation it was absorbed into Wammerawa, along with Castlereagh and Liverpool Plains. Mudgee was recreated for the 1927 election. It was abolished in 1968 and replaced by Burrendong.

Members for Mudgee

Election results

References

Former electoral districts of New South Wales
1859 establishments in Australia
Constituencies established in 1859
1920 disestablishments in Australia
Constituencies disestablished in 1920
1927 establishments in Australia
Constituencies established in 1927
1968 disestablishments in Australia
Constituencies disestablished in 1968